Tuszyn  is a small town in Łódź East County, Łódź Voivodeship, central Poland, with 7,237 inhabitants (2020).

Climate
Tuszyn has a humid continental climate (Cfb in the Köppen climate classification).

<div style="width:70%;">

</div style>

References

External links
Official town website
Unofficial town website

Cities and towns in Łódź Voivodeship
Łódź East County
Sieradz Voivodeship (1339–1793)
Piotrków Governorate
Łódź Voivodeship (1919–1939)